Gayéri is a town located in the province of Komondjari in Burkina Faso. It is the capital of Komondjari Province.

References 

Populated places in the Est Region (Burkina Faso)
Komondjari Province